{{Speciesbox
|image = Crepis_modocensis_9235.JPG
|image_caption = Crepis modocensis in Wenas Wildlife Area
|genus = Crepis
|species = modocensis
|authority = E. Greene
|synonyms_ref = 
|synonyms =
Crepis scopulorum Coville
Psilochenia modocensis (Greene) W.A.Weber 
Crepis glareosa Piper, syn of subsp. glareosa 
Crepis rostrata Coville, syn of subsp. rostrata  
Crepis subacaulis <small>(Kellogg) Coville, syn of subsp. rostrata '</small>
}}Crepis modocensis is a species of flowering plant in the family Asteraceae known by the common name Modoc hawksbeard.

It is native to western North America (British Columbia, Washington, Oregon, California, Nevada, Utah, Idaho, Montana, Wyoming, Colorado), where it grows in several types of mountain and plateau habitat, including sagebrush.Calflora taxon report, University of California, Crepis modocensis  E. Greene, Modoc hawksbeard  It typically prefers rocky soil.

The species name is from the Modoc Plateau, in the northeast California range.

DescriptionCrepis modocensis is a perennial herb growing an erect stem up to 45 centimeters (18 inches) tall and often lined with long bristles. The woolly and sometimes bristly leaves are dark-veined and edged with blunt and sharp lobes. The longest leaves at the base of the plant reach about 25 centimeters (10 inches) long.

The fruit is an achene around a centimeter long which is black, sometimes green or red tinted, and sports a tufty white pappus.

SubspeciesCrepis modocensis subsp. glareosa (Piper) Babc. & Stebbins – Kittitas County in WashingtonCrepis modocensis subsp. modocensis – most of species rangeCrepis modocensis subsp. rostrata (Coville) Babc. & Stebbins – British Columbia, WashingtonCrepis modocensis subsp. subacaulis (Kellogg) Babc. & Stebbins – California, Montana, Nevada, OregonC. modocensis may have hybridized with Crepis atribarba to produce Crepis barbigera'', the head size of which is intermediate between its prospective parent species.

References

External links
Calflora Database: Crepis modocensis (Modoc hawksbeard)
Jepson Manual eFlora (TJM2) treatment of Crepis modocensis
USDA Plants Profile for Crepis modocensis (Modoc hawksbeard)
UC CalPhotos gallery of Crepis modocensis

modocensis
Flora of the Northwestern United States
Flora of British Columbia
Flora of California
Flora of Nevada
Flora of Utah
Flora of the Great Basin
Flora of the Sierra Nevada (United States)
~
Plants described in 1895
Taxa named by Edward Lee Greene
Flora without expected TNC conservation status